US Assure is an American insurance company that distributes, underwrites and services construction and property insurance products across the U.S. for “A” rated carriers.

Programs
 US Assure Builders Risk Plan insured by Zurich Insurance Group
 Property Insurance

Services
 Underwriting
 Service centers
 Billing

Sponsorship
In 2015, US Assure became the sponsor of the premium seating at EverBank Field and in August 2016 the area was named the US Assure Club.

See also
 List of insurance topics
 List of United States insurance companies

References

Financial services companies established in 1977
Insurance companies based in Florida
Privately held companies based in Florida
Financial services companies based in Jacksonville, Florida
1977 establishments in Florida